Supermodelo 2008 was the third and final season of Supermodelo. This season saw significant changes when former host Judit Mascó was replaced by Eloísa González. For the first time, male contestants were allowed to participate in a separate competition from the females, whose winner would eventually be the representative for Spain in the annual Elite Model Look contest as in the two previous years. Various changes and variations of the format proved to be very unpopular with Spanish audience and the show was cut after a total of eight weeks on air. The last week of the competition saw the back to back eliminations of the seventh, sixth, fifth and fourth placers, and the live final took place that same week on June 20 with the remaining six contestants. The winners of the competition were 21 year old Eva Prieto from Barcelona and 20 year old Oliver Baggerman from Tenerife.

Format 
The main competition was held live, and a public vote determined who would be eliminated each week. Three contestants from each gender were nominated by the judges every week. Emmanuel Rouzic, José Fernández-Pacheco, and Marie-Ange Schmitt-Lebreton would each chose two nominees for elimination. Prior to this, two contestants would be granted immunity from elimination. The breakdown of each week was as follows:
 On Wednesdays, one contestant of each gender would be granted immunity. 
 On Thursdays, three female contestants would be selected to go against the public vote for elimination. 
 On Fridays, three male contestants would be selected to go against the public vote for elimination. 
 On Mondays, a nominated female contestant would be eliminated.
 On Tuesdays, a nominated male contestant would be eliminated.

No elimination took place on the Monday or Tuesday of the first round of the finals, as there had been no nominees up to that point.

Episodes
Episodes aired from Monday through Friday beginning on April 28. Week 7 had only 4 episodes, as no episode aired on Tuesday June 10.

Casting
Originally aired: 28 April - 2 May; 5–9 May; 12–16 May 2008

In the beginning of the show the top 25 semi-finalists from each gender, a total of fifty contestants, were invited to an official casting audition which took part on a Costa cruise ship. On the first day, thirty semi-finalists were eliminated, leaving a total of 20 semi-finalists. The selected contestants boarded at the Port of Barcelona, and the ship began sailing east, continuing down the Italian Peninsula to visit locations like Savona and Rome. The ship later stopped on the island of Sicily to visit Palermo, and made additional stops in Malta and Tunisia. All throughout the voyage, the models received visits from fashion experts for various lessons and photo shoot sessions. After several days of eliminations the top 8 of each gender was selected and the final 16 contestants moved into the model villa.

Week 1
Originally aired: 19–23 May 2008

The sixteen finalists had their measurements taken, and two new contestants, Mario and Nora, entered the competition.

Entered: Mario Rodríguez & Nora Gárate

Judge and photographer Emmanuel Rouzic had a photo shoot session with the models. They also had a small presentation for Custo Barcelona, and were taught how to style themselves. 2007 winner Noelia López met with the models to share her experiences on the show. They also received a lesson on fitness and healthy eating from Martina Miserachs. Afterwards, there was a 60's themed mock runway show where styling professor Josie (José Fernández-Pacheco) went over everyone's personal sense of style. This was followed by a third and final runway inspired by the Dos de Mayo Uprising. Andres was granted immunity through the consensus of the female contestants, while Raquel was granted immunity through the consensus of the male contestants.

Immune from elimination: Andrés Moreno & Raquel Martínez	

Based on the results of the photo shoot, Rouzic chose Mario and Isabel as his nominees for elimination. The following day Josie chose Luis and Nora as the second nominees for elimination. The models had a runway lesson with Hernando Herrera, and the females had a photo shoot on a construction site. Rosa Clará arrived with the contestants to invite Yara to her runway show in Barcelona, along with a night out and a runway appearance at Lacroix. She was also given the opportunity to take one of the other models along with her, and she chose Javier. Judge Marie-Ange Schmitt-Lebreton deemed Javier as the best model of the week, and he was awarded €1,000 to go shopping.

Supermodel of the week: Javier Vázquez	

The contestants found out that they would be having a runway show with dogs, and tensions were high in anticipation of the last round of nominations. The three professors went over everyone's progress and attitude throughout the week, and Marie-Ange chose Abdel and Belén as her nominees for elimination.

Nominated for elimination: Abdel Abdelkade, Belén Alarcón, Isabel Conejo, Luis Jiménez, Mario Rodríguez & Nora Gárate

Week 2
Originally aired: 26–30 May 2008

The three nominated female contestants had to pack their bags in preparation for the results of the public vote. The models took part in a live runway show, and the first girl to be saved by the public was Nora. Before the final save, the show went over footage of dinner between the contestants and Fiona Ferrer Leoni, a fictitious wedding between Ivan and Amparo, and a car photo shoot session Rouzic. After a second runway show, it was revealed that Isabel had received the least support from the public, and she was eliminated from the competition. The male elimination was scheduled for the following day.

Eliminated: Isabel Conejo

Before finding out who would be the first male contestant saved from elimination, the show went over a wet and sensual photo shoot in a pool with Rouzic. Host Eloísa González revealed that Mario was safe from elimination. This was followed by a runway show in underwear, and footage of new nutrition classes, dance lessons, and a styling class with Josie. After the final runway show of the night, Abdel was eliminated from the competition.

Eliminated: Abdel Abdelkade

On the Wednesday after the eliminations, the contestants had to determine who would be given immunity. The boys had a fashion show with designer Ion Fiz, in which they had to demonstrate elegance and class. After the show, the girls decided that Oliver should be given immunity. The female contestants had a runway with snakes, and the male contestants granted their immunity to Mamen.

Immune from elimination: Mamen Solís & Oliver Baggerman	

The following day, the professors had to select three of the female contestants for elimination. Meanwhile, Yara and Javier went to Barcelona for the Rosa Clará runway show that had been planned the previous week. Ion Fiz had a show with the girls. After an angels and devils themed photo shoot, Rouzic nominated Yara for elimination. A nude runway in which the girls wore nothing but the bags they carried took place after that. Josie decided to nominate Nora for elimination, while Marie-Ange nominated Amparo.

Nominated for elimination: María Amparo Gracia, Nora Gárate & Yara Cobo

Catalina and Amparo were given makeovers, and Mamen was chosen as the model of the week. The contestants later had a roller-blade runway show in pairs, and Arturo, Iván and Mario were chosen as the new male nominees for elimination.

Supermodel of the week: Mamen Solís	
Nominated for elimination: Arturo Galvéz, Iván Plata & Mario Rodríguez

Week 3
Originally aired: 2–6 June 2008

The three nominees, Amparo, Nora, and Yara along with the other contestants walked in a gothic style runway show. Afterwards, the show reviewed a sexy bedroom photo shoot the contestants had earlier with Andres Amoros. At the end of the gala, it was revealed that Nora had received the fewest votes, and she was eliminated.

Eliminated: Nora Gárate

The opening runway show the next day was an homage to Yves Saint Laurent. The first male contestant saved from elimination was Ivan. Afterwards, the show went over footage of new modeling classes and a vampire photo shoot, and the final fashion show of the day took place. Immediately after this Mario was eliminated from the competition.

Eliminated: Mario Rodríguez

The remaining 16 models walked for Elio Berhanyer and had a photo shoot where they posed as statues. Belen was given immunity from elimination. She was also given the chance to walk in an important show in Mallorca. The models then had a dance lesson with Adrián Herrero and a second fashion show after which Arturo was given immunity. Marie-Ange declared that Mamen had been the best during the shows, and the contestants learned that they would be having a photo shoot session with Vicent Calderon. Mamen and Andrés were also selected for an individual shoot for Fórmula Joven.

Immune from elimination: Arturo Gálvez & Belén Alarcón	

On the following day, the male nominations took place. The contestants were scolded for enjoying time off instead of practicing for the runway, a show with designs from Luis Mercader. Luis was nominated for elimination once again. The models had their photo shoot with Vicente Calderon, with the exception of Mamen and Andrés, who had their shoot for Fórmula Joven. After a final runway show, Oliver and Aarón were nominated for elimination.

Nominated for elimination: Aarón Martínez, Luis Jiménez & Oliver Baggerman

Andrés, Mamen and Raquel received makeovers, and two new contestants, Benito and Marcela, entered the competition. Catalina was chosen as the model of the week, and was rewarded with €1,000 to go shopping. After a runway show and photo shoot, Yara's poor performance earned her a nomination. The models also had a dinner to cheer their spirits. This was followed by a geeky and nerdy runway show the following day, where Eva and Raquel were nominated for elimination. In the end, it was revealed that there would be a double elimination at the beginning of the following week.

Entered: Benito Daza & Marcela Fuentes
Supermodel of the week: Catalina Aguilar
Nominated for elimination: Eva Prieto, Raquel Martínez & Yara Cobo

Week 4
Originally aired: 9–13 June 2008

The models explored femininity and masculinity, and took part in an androgynous runway show. Out of the three male nominees, Luis was chosen by the public to be eliminated. The show then went over footage of a sexy kissing photo shoot session, and a trip where the contestants traveled to Zaragoza for a fashion exposition. After a second fashion show celebrating ethnicity, the results of the female nominees were revealed, and Raquel was eliminated from the competition.

Eliminated: Luis Jiménez & Raquel Martínez

Tension in the training center mounted over food consumption. The remaining models had a body painting fashion show and shoot with the colors of the Spanish flag for the 2008 UEFA European Football Championship. After a second runway show with designs by Miguel Suay, Javier was given immunity. The models later had a bathing suit show with Paula Vázquez, and a final show separated into two groups led by Arturo and Belen. Marie-Ange chose Belen's group as the winners. After this, Eva was granted immunity.

Immune from elimination: Eva Prieto & Javier Vázquez
Nominated for elimination: Marcela Fuentes, María Amparo Gracia & Yara Cobo
Nominated for elimination: Andrés Moreno, Benito Daza e Iván Plata

Week 5
Originally aired: 16–20 June 2008

Eliminated: Benito Daza & Marcela Fuentes
Eliminated: Andrés Moreno & Catalina Aguilar
Supermodel of the week: María Amparo Gracia
Eliminated: Arturo Gálvez & Yara Cobo
Eliminated: Iván Plata & Mamen Solís
Eliminated: Aarón Martínez & Belén Alarcón
Runners-up: Javier Vázquez & María Amparo Gracia
Supermodelo 2008: Eva Prieto & Oliver Baggerman

Contestants
(ages stated are at start of contest)

Results

★ The contestant was chosen as the model of the week
 IMM.  The contestant was immune from elimination
 NOM  The contestant was nominated for elimination 
 ELIM  The contestant was eliminated 
 FINAL  The contestant advanced to the finale
 WINNER  The contestant won the competition

Beginning on June 17 after the final eliminations based on the nominations of week 4, the remaining contestants were eliminated based solely on the public vote. The final six (Aarón, Belén, Eva, Javier, M.ª Amparo and Oliver) participated in the live final, where Eva and Oliver were crowned as the winners.

Judges and mentors
 Eloísa González - host
 Marie-Ange Schmitt-Lebreton - head of the training center; former model & judge
 Emmanuel Rouzic - photographer & judge
 José Fernández-Pacheco "Josie" - styling professor & judge
 Adrián Herrero - dance instructor
 Andrés Amorós - assistant photographer
 Fiona Ferrer Leoni - fashion coordinator
 Hernando Herrera - male runway coach
 Jimmy Roca - fitness coach
 Laura Romero - makeup artist
 Martina Miserachs - nutritionist
 Montserrat Heras - female runway coach
 Raquel Peñaranda - assistant photographer
 Ricardo Jordán - acting instructor

Viewing figures

References

External links
 Official website (archive at the Wayback Machine)

2000s Spanish television series